Ambikeshwar Mishra (born 27 November 1993) is an Indian cricketer. He made his List A debut for Railways in the 2016–17 Vijay Hazare Trophy on 4 March 2017. He made his Twenty20 debut for Railways in the 2018–19 Syed Mushtaq Ali Trophy on 11 March 2019.

References

External links
 

1993 births
Living people
Indian cricketers
Railways cricketers
Place of birth missing (living people)